The 2005 National Pro Fastpitch season was the second season of professional softball under the name National Pro Fastpitch (NPF) for  the only professional women's fastpitch softball league in the United States.  From 1997 to 2002, NPF operated under the names Women's Pro Fastpitch (WPF) and Women's Pro Softball League (WPSL).   Each year, the playoff teams battle for the Cowles Cup.

Teams, cities and stadiums

Milestones and events
The expansion Chicago Bandits joined the league for the 2005 season.

The New York Juggernaut announced a new owner, John Schmitz of Long Island, NY. The team also introduced 1996 Olympic Gold Medalist Julie Smith as their general manager and head coach.

The Arizona Heat named Stacy Iveson as their 2005 field manager.

NPF's telecast included ESPN2 broadcasting the NPF All-Star Game and the NPF Championship Game. Comcast Sports Net Chicago showed select Chicago Bandits games and Telecare televised certain Juggernaut games.

Player acquisition

College draft

The 2005 NPF Senior Draft was held February 7, 2005.  Amy Harre of Southern Illinois was selected first by the Chicago Bandits.

Notable transactions

Various Olympians joined NPF after winning the gold medal in Softball at the 2004 Summer Olympics:
 The expansion Bandits' early signings included a number of Olympic gold medalists, among them three-time Olympic Gold Medalist Leah O’Brien-Amico and Jennie Finch.
 The Juggernaut signed 2004 Olympic gold medalist Natasha Watley.
The Arizona Heat signed gold medalist Jessica Mendoza.  Mendoza joined other Heat US gold medalists Lovieanne Jung and Tairia Mims-Flowers
 The Racers also signed players from the 2004 Olympic team: infielder Crystl Bustos, outfielder Kelly Kretschman, and catcher Jenny Topping.

League standings 
Source 

The 2005 schedule included  a 48-game regular season schedule for each NPF teams.

The California Sunbirds played a partial schedule.  The Sunbirds hoped to return to NPF full-time, but never did.  Games were on the schedule against international teams: Australia, Canada, China, Russia and Venezuela.

Potential expansion teams also appeared on the schedule.  These were Stratford Brakettes, Phoenix Flames, SoCal Schutt Hurricanes, Peoria Outlaws, Illinois Cougars, St. Louis Saints and the Long Island Angels.  Of these candidates, only the Brakettes ever became a full-time NPF member, for only one season in 2006.

All games against international teams and expansion candidates counted in the standings for the primary NPF teams.

NPF Championship

The 2005 NPF Championship Series was held at Benedictine University Sports Complex in Lisle, Illinois August 27 and 28.  The top four teams qualified and were seeded based on the final standings.  The series matched the teams up in a double-elimination bracket.  The series matched the teams up in a single-elimination bracket.

Championship Game

NPF All-Star Game
The 2005 NPF All-Star Game was held August 28.  The East All-Star team included players from New York Juggernaut, the New England Riptide, and the Akron Racers. The West All-Star team included players from Chicago Bandits, the Arizona Heat, and the Texas Thunder.  The East won by a score of 2-1, and Iyhia McMichael of Akron Racers was chosen Most Valuable Player.

Annual awards
Source:

See also

 List of professional sports leagues
 List of professional sports teams in the United States and Canada

References

External links 
 

Softball teams
2005 in women's softball
2005 in American women's sports
Softball in the United States